Admiral is one of the highest ranks in some navies. In the Commonwealth nations and the United States, a "full" admiral is equivalent to a "full" general in the army or the air force, and is above vice admiral and below admiral of the fleet, or fleet admiral.

Etymology
The word  in Middle English comes from Anglo-French , "commander", from Medieval Latin , .

The 1818 edition of Samuel Johnson's A Dictionary of the English Language, edited and revised by the Rev. Henry John Todd, states that the term “has been traced to the Arab. emir or amir, lord or commander, and the Gr. , the sea, q. d. prince of the sea. The word is written both with and without the d, in other languages, as well as our own. Barb. Lat. admirallus and amiralius. V. Ducange. Barb. Græc. ἄμηρχλιος. V. Meursii Gloss. Græco-Barbarum, edit. 1610. p. 29. Fr. admiral and amiral. Dan. the same. Germ. ammiral. Dutch, admirael or ammirael. Ital. ammiraglio. Sp. almirante. Minsheu, in his Spanish Dictionary, says ‘almiralle is a king in the Arabian language.’ Amrayl is used by Robert of Gloucester, in the sense of a prince, or governour.”

The quote from John Minsheu’s Dictionarie in Spanish and English (1599), given in Johnson’s Dictionary, has been confirmed as being accurate. Additionally, the definition of Amīr (أمير), as given in Edward William Lane's Arabic-English Lexicon, concurs, in part, with Minsheu's definition, stating that the term means “One having, holding, or possessing, command; a commander; a governor; a lord; a prince, or king.”

While other Greek words of the period existed to indicate “belonging to the sea,” or “of the sea,” the now obsolete Gr.  mentioned in Johnson's Dictionary is expressly defined as "of the sea, Lat. marinus, epith. of sea-gods, nymphs, etc."

Though there are multiple meanings for the Arabic Amīr (أمير), the literal meaning of the phrase Amīr al-Baḥr (أمير البحر) is “Prince of the Sea.” This position, versus “commander of the sea,” is demonstrated by legal practices prevailing in the Ottoman Empire, whereas it was only possible for Phanariots to qualify for attaining four princely positions, those being grand dragoman, dragoman of the fleet, and the voivodees of Moldavia and Wallachia. Those Phanariots who attained the princely position of dragoman of the fleet served under the Ottoman admiral having administration of the Aegean islands and the Anatolian coast.

Modern acknowledgement of the phrase Amīr al-Baḥr (أمير البحر) meaning “Prince of the Sea” includes a speech made in an official U.S. military ceremony conducted in an Arabic port, and a news article published by an Arabic news outlet: On 24 May 2012, in a change of command ceremony aboard aircraft carrier USS Enterprise (CVN 65), while docked at Khalifa Bin Salman Port, Bahrain, U.S. Marine Corps Gen. James Mattis, Commander, U.S. Central Command, introduced Vice Admiral Mark I. Fox as “Admiral Fox, the prince of the sea, emir of the sea – to translate ‘admiral’ from the Arabic to English;” On 04 Feb 2021, in an announcement of his coronavirus-related death, the Arabic news website Saudi 24 News referred to Admiral Edmond Chagoury by the title “Prince of the Sea.”

An alternate etymology proposes that the term admiral evolved, instead, from the title of Amīr al-Umarāʾ (أمير الأمراء‎). Under the reign of the Buyid dynasty (934 to 1062) of Iraq and Iran, the title of Amīr al-Umarāʾ, which means prince of princes, came to denote the heir-apparent, or crown prince.

This alternate etymology states that the term was in use for the Greco-Arab naval leaders of Norman Sicily, which had formerly been ruled by Arabs, at least by the early 11th century. During this time, the Norman Roger II of Sicily (1095–1154) employed a Greek Christian, known as George of Antioch, who previously had served as a naval commander for several North African Muslim rulers.

The Sicilians and later Genoese took the first two parts of the term and used them as one word, from their Aragon opponents. As the word was used by people speaking Latin or Latin-based languages it gained the "d" and endured a series of different endings and spellings leading to the English spelling  in the 14th century and to admiral by the 16th century.

Further history
The word "admiral" has come to be almost exclusively associated with the highest naval rank in most of the world's navies, equivalent to the army rank of general. However, this was not always the case; for example, in some European countries prior to the end of World War II, admiral was the third highest naval rank after general admiral and grand admiral.

The rank of admiral has also been subdivided into various grades, several of which are historically extinct while others remain in use in most present-day navies. The Royal Navy used the colours red, white, and blue, in descending order to indicate seniority of its admirals until 1864; for example, Horatio Nelson's highest rank was vice-admiral of the white. The generic term for these naval equivalents of army generals is flag officer. Some navies have also used army-type titles for them, such as the Cromwellian "general at sea".

NATO code
While the rank of admiral is used in most of NATO countries, it is ranked differently depending on the country.

Admiral insignia by country

National ranks
 Admiral (Australia)
 Admiral (Bangladesh)
 Admiral (Canada)
 Admiral (Denmark)
 Admiral (Germany)
 Admiral (India)
 Admiral (Netherlands)
 Admiral (Pakistan)
 Admiral (Russia)
 Admiral of Castile
 Admiral (Sri Lanka)
 Admiral (Sweden)
 Admiral (United Kingdom)
 Admiral (United States)

See also
 Admiralissimo
 Admiralty
 Comparative military ranks
 Isabel Barreto, the first female admiral
 Laksamana, native title for naval leaders in Indonesia and Malaysia
 Nebraska Admiral
 Ranks and insignia of NATO navies' officers

References

External links

 
 

Naval ranks